Gaston-Laurent Coeurdoux (18 December 1691, Bourges, France – 15 June 1779, Pondicherry, French India) was a French Jesuit missionary in South India and a noteworthy Indologist.

Early training
Cœurdoux entered the novitiate of the Jesuits in 1715, was ordained in 1725, and made his final religious profession as a Jesuit in 1731, at Orléans. Shortly afterwards he left for India, arriving at the Madurai Mission (now in Tamil Nadu in southern India) in 1732.

Career as a missionary and religious superior
Cœurdoux first studied Telugu, a major language of the Dravidian group, in order to work in the region of present Andhra Pradesh, in particular Krishnapuram, Bukkapuram, and Darmavaram Madigubba (1736 to 1737). In 1737, for health reasons, he had to return and remain in Pondicherry. He was the superior of the mission at Karnataka from 1744 to 1751 while he was serving the 4,000 Catholic Tamils in Pondicherry. As superior, he was obliged, against his own inclinations, to enforce the very restrictive decree of Pope Benedict XIV (12 September 1744 ) on the "Malabar rites". Convinced of the importance of the contemplative life, he brought together a number of Tamil girls and founded a Carmelite convent with them in 1748.

Contributions to Indology
Cœurdoux is best known today as an Indologist. Talented at languages, he composed a Telugu–French–Sanskrit dictionary which is still authoritative. A disciple of the Jesuit philologist Jean Calmette, whom he knew personally in India, he was particularly interested in comparative linguistics. Max Müller called him the father of comparative philology. He was in contact with the French Indologists Anquetil Duperron and Joseph Nicolas de l'Isle. In a Mémoire sent to the Académie des inscriptions et belles-lettres (France) in 1767, he demonstrated the similarity between the Sanskrit, Latin, Greek, and even German and Russian. His observations were later compiled and published by others in Europe. He never returned to his homeland. Anquetil Duperron published a whole chapter after the French Revolution. Abbé Dubois also used them, passing them off to the British East India Company in Madras as his own work (1808). It was only in the late 20th century, thanks to the work of J.J. Godfrey and Sylvia Murr (see Bibliography), that Cœurdoux's role in the discovery of the relationship between Sanskrit and the ancient languages of Europe had been re-established.

Bibliography
 Mœurs et coutumes des Indiens. Ed. N.-J. Desvaulx. 1777.

References

Further reading
 Armenteros, Carolina. "The Enlightened Conservatism of the Malabar Missions: Gaston-Laurent Coeurdoux (1691–1779) and the Making of an Anthropological Classic", Journal of Jesuit Studies, 6 (2019): 439–66.
DE SMET, Richard. Review of Sylvie Murr, Vol. 1: Mœurs et coutumes des Indiens (1777): Un inédit du père G.-L. Coeurdoux, S.J. dans la version de N.-J. Desvaulx. Vol. II: L’indologie du père Cœurdoux (Paris: Ecole française d’extrême-orient, 1987). Indian Theological Studies 27 (1990) 371–373.
FERROLI, Domenico. The Jesuits in Malabar. 2 vols. Bangalore, 1939/1951.
GODFREY, J.J. "Sir William Jones and Père Cœurdoux: a philological footnote." Journal of the American Oriental Society 87 (1967) 57–59.
MURR, Sylvie. L'Inde philosophique entre Bossuet et Voltaire – I. Moeurs et coutumes des Indiens (1777). Un inedit du père G.-L. Cœurdoux, S.J. dans la version de N.-J. Desvaulx. Vol. 1. Ed. Sylvie Murr. Paris: Ecole française d'extrême-orient, 1987. 247 pp.
MURR, Sylvie. L'Inde philosophique entre Bossuet et Voltaire – II. L'indologie du père Cœurdoux. Stratégie, apologétique et scientificité. Vol. 2. Ed. Sylvie Murr. Paris: Ecole française d'extrême-orient, 1987. 250 pp.

See also
William Jones (philologist)

1691 births
1779 deaths
French Indologists
18th-century French Jesuits
Clergy from Bourges
French Roman Catholic missionaries
Roman Catholic missionaries in India
Jesuit missionaries
French expatriates in India
Writers from Bourges